Ariel Behar and Enrique López Pérez were the defending champions but only López Pérez chose to defend his title, partnering Alejandro Davidovich Fokina. Davidovich Fokina and López Pérez retired in their first round match against Karol Drzewiecki and Szymon Walków.

Sander Arends and David Pel won the title after defeating Drzewiecki and Walków 7–5, 6–4 in the final.

Seeds

Draw

References

External links
 Main draw

Rafa Nadal Open Banc Sabadell - Doubles